Hypoplastic right heart syndrome is a congenital heart defect in which the right atrium and right ventricle are underdeveloped. This defect causes inadequate blood flow to the lungs and thus, a blue or cyanotic infant.

Symptoms and signs
Common symptoms include a grayish-blue (cyanosis) coloration to the skin, lips, fingernails and other parts of the body. Other pronounced symptoms can be rapid/difficulty breathing, poor feeding, cold hands or feet, or being inactive and drowsy. "In a baby with hypoplastic right heart syndrome, if the natural connections between the heart's left and right sides (foramen oval and ductus arteriosus) are allowed to close, he or she may go into shock." Signs of shock can include cool or clammy skin, a weak or rapid pulse, and dilated pupils.

Causes
The Notch-signaling pathway is involved in multiple processes during heart development, along with Wnt signaling. Cardiomyocyte differentiation, patterning of the different cardiac regions, valve development, ventricular trabeculation, and outflow tract development have all been shown to depend on the activity of specific Notch-signaling elements. The importance of Notch signaling in human disease is evident from the discovery that many mutations in components of this pathway are inherited in several genetic and acquired disorders, though one cannot acquire hypoplastic right heart syndrome. Some of the mutations are thought to be on chromosome 2. Other deletions are thought to be chromosomal arms 9q34 and 20p12, which contain NOTCH1 and JAG1 and deletion of band q22 or q24. Wnt signaling also plays a role along with Notch 1,2 and JAG in the formation of cardiac tissues and heart development. When there are mutations in the Notch and Wnt pathways, Notch and Wnt are either not signaled or inhibited. These pathways have to signal proteins and other pathways, like Tbx2, 3 and 20, Bmp2, 10, and Hey1 and 2 which play a major role in different parts of the heart developing. When these proteins and other pathways are not signaled or are inhibited abnormalities form.

Pathogenesis
When the right side of the heart is more underdeveloped than the left side, this is known as hypoplastic right heart syndrome. HRHS is known for the pulmonary atresia valves, the tricuspid valve, and the hypoplastic pulmonary artery fail to form properly. HRHS also causes the right ventricle to be a fair amount smaller than the left side.

In people with hypoplastic right heart syndrome, the heart is not able to adequately pump blood to the lungs. The result of this is an inadequate supply of oxygenated blood to be circulated to the body. The severity of underdevelopment varies for each individual. A special team of pediatric cardiologists is required to develop a treatment plan.

Anatomy
A healthy heart has four valves, separated by flaps that open and close to control blood flow between the chambers. When the heart beats, oxygen-poor blood enters the right atrium. The blood then flows into the right ventricle, where it enters the pulmonary artery to travel to the lungs for oxygen. Oxygen-rich blood returns to the left atrium, where it then travels into the left ventricle. The left ventricle pushes the oxygenated blood into the aorta to be circulated to the rest of the body.

The heart is a mesoderm-derived organ; Mesoderm is the middle germ layer of an embryo, whose formation is regulated by various genes. Initially, the most important is expression of Nkx2.5, CR1, pitx2, anf and mhc2a, is responsible for differentiation of the types of cardiomyocytes to determine which part of the heart they go to. In a later in differentiation, activation of  hand1, hand2 and other genes was revealed to help in development. Expression of these genes expression is regulated by various processes, including transcription and growth factors, as well as proteins like fibrillin, Wnt, BMP2, BMP 4, BMP5, BMP7,  which aid in different heart development features like the valves and septum, and other substances, such as retinoid and folic acid.

Crucial steps in heart formation are development of the ventricles and atrium formation, as well as septation and valve formation. Any disturbances of such processes may lead to various congenital heart diseases and defects that could be initiated by various genetic, epigenetic or environmental factors. The most common heart malformations from genetic or epigenetic problems are: stenosis of the aorta and pulmonary trunk, which is a narrowing of the vessels, atrial and/or ventricular septal defect, tricuspid atresia, hypoplastic left and right heart.  When you have hypoplastic right or left heart more than one of these problems occur together.

Diagnosis
If a cardiac anomaly is suspected in a routine ultrasound during pregnancy, often a perinatologist (maternal-fetal specialist) will perform a fetal echocardiogram (noninvasive ultrasound of the fetus heart), which may be able to confirm a diagnosis of HRHS. This can help with possible options for treatment.

Treatment
There is no cure for hypoplastic right heart syndrome. A three-stage surgical procedure is commonly used to treat the condition. The surgeries rearrange the blood flow within the heart and allow the left ventricles to do the work for the underdeveloped right side of the heart. The three surgeries are spread out over the patients first few years of life. The first procedure, usually either the Norwood procedure or BT shunt, is typically done within the first few days or weeks of life. The second procedure, called the Glenn procedure, is usually performed between four and twelve months of age. The last surgery, known as the Fontan procedure, is typically performed around the age of 18 months and older. These surgeries change the blood flow to the lungs so that there is always oxygenated blood. 

In a stage 1 Norwood procedure for hypoplastic right heart, the main pulmonary artery is separated from the left and right portions of the pulmonary artery and joined with the upper portion of the aorta. The proximal pulmonary artery is  connected to the aortic arch, while the narrowed segment of the pulmonary trunk is repaired. An aortopulmonary shunt is created to connect the aorta to the main pulmonary artery to provide pulmonary blood flow to the lungs. The Glenn procedure disconnects the superior vena cava from the heart and connects it to the right pulmonary artery so deoxygenated blood from the upper body goes directly to the lungs. The Fontan procedure, done usually after the patient is two years old, disconnects the inferior vena cava from the heart and connects it directly with the other pulmonary artery so that deoxygenated blood from the lower body then is sent directly to the lungs.

Follow-up care
With a series of operations or even a heart transplant, a newborn can be treated but not be cured. Young individuals who have undergone reconstructive surgery must refer to a cardiologist who is experienced in congenital heart diseases, "Children with HLHS are at an increased level for developing endocarditis." Kids that have been diagnosed with HRHS must limit the physical activity they participate in to their own endurance level.

Prevalence
Hypoplastic right heart syndrome is less common than hypoplastic left heart syndrome within the United States alone it occurs in 1 in 60,000 births as opposed to the latter that occurs in 1 in 4,300 births.
This rare anomaly requires prenatal diagnosis since it needs immediate and emergency treatment. Pregnant women whose pregnancy is complicated with this anomaly should be referred to a level 3 hospital with pediatric cardiology and pediatric cardiothoracic surgical team.

It can be associated with aortic stenosis.

References

External links 

Congenital heart defects
Syndromes